The 1994 Osijek café shooting was a mass shooting that occurred on June 18, 1994 in Osijek, Osijek-Baranja County, Croatia. Borislav Bešlić shot dead four people and wounded eight others.

Shooting
On the evening of June 18, 1994 in Osijek, Borislav Bešlić returned from the front with an automatic rifle. He went to the café Grafičar, although the owner closed the gate and told everyone that it does not work, because there were two groups of people, one of whom was celebrating the anniversary of graduation, Bešlić climbed through the gate and entered the café. The celebration was in full swing and the musicians played two Serbian songs. These songs angered Bešlić and he started firing. He fired through a closed glass door, went into the middle and continued firing. Then he sat down at the table, put a machine gun and two grenades on it. He was found there by police. Two guests and two waiters were killed and 8 were injured.

Perpetrator
Borislav Bešlić (41) was a member of the 5th Home Guard Regiment Croatia. The commander of his regiment could not explain how he took the weapon with him. Earlier, he set fire to the restaurant "Fruska gora" in Osijek and was convicted for it.

See also
 Podvinje cafe shooting
 Slučaj "Selotejp"

References

Osijek café shooting
Mass shootings in Croatia
Anti-Serbian sentiment
Croatian nationalism
Attacks on restaurants in Europe
Osijek café shooting
Osijek café shooting
History of Osijek